The 1997 Wismilak International was a women's tennis tournament played on outdoor hard courts in Surabaya in Indonesia that was part of Tier IV of the 1997 WTA Tour. The tournament was held from 22 September through 28 September 1997.

Finals

Singles

 Dominique Van Roost defeated  Lenka Němečková 6–1, 6–3
 It was Van Roost's 3rd title of the year and the 5th of her career.

Doubles

 Kerry-Anne Guse /  Rika Hiraki defeated  Maureen Drake /  Renata Kolbovic 6–1, 7–6
 It was Guse's 3rd title of the year and the 6th of her career. It was Hiraki's 4th title of the year and the 7th of her career.

References

External links
 ITF tournament edition details

Wismilak International
Commonwealth Bank Tennis Classic
1997 in Indonesian tennis